Drug Island is an island in Ketchikan Gateway Borough, Alaska, in the United States.

Drug Island was named in 1920, but it is unclear why the name "Drug Island" was applied to this island.

References

Islands of Alaska
Islands of Ketchikan Gateway Borough, Alaska